The Blood and the Body is a gothic rock album by Eerie Von,  released on June 15, 1999, by Cleopatra Records. It is his second album since he left the metal band Danzig. The music was recorded on a four track cassette system using an acoustic guitar and a keyboard purchased from Toys "R" Us.

Track listing
 An Investment In Hate - 4.19
 Madonnica Diabolita - 5.30
 The Sum Of Love - 4.44
 The Inferno Room - 6.12
 The Wheel - 10.12
 The First Hymn - 4.42
 The Blood And The Body - 4.48
 Good - 4.27
 A Lover's Knot - 4.23
 What's The Count Jack? - 4.41
 Dungenous - 1.04
 Sell My Soul (Maybe I Will) - 4.20

All tracks written, performed and produced by Eerie Von. Additional vocals on "The Inferno Room" by Mary Von.

References

Eerie Von albums
1999 albums
Cleopatra Records albums